Jan Thielmann (born 26 May 2002) is a German professional footballer who plays as a right winger for Bundesliga club 1. FC Köln.

Club career

1. FC Köln

In his youth years, Thielmann first played in the then youth game community Hetzerath / Föhren / Bekond and switched to the youth team of Eintracht Trier for the 2014–15 season. For the 2017–18 season, he moved to the U17s of 1. FC Köln. He played 24 games for the team and won the championship with them in June 2019 after a 3–2 win over Borussia Dortmund.

In the 2019–20 season, Thielmann was promoted to the U19s. He made his professional debut with 1. FC Köln in a 2–0 Bundesliga win over Bayer 04 Leverkusen on 14 December 2019. In doing so, he became the first footballer born in 2002 to play in the Bundesliga, and was the second youngest league debutant for his club after Yann Aurel Bisseck.

After a convincing debut, manager Markus Gisdol continued to start Thielmann in games against Eintracht Frankfurt and Werder Bremen. In January 2020, Thielmann signed his first professional contract. The collaboration between him and 1. FC Köln was extended until 30 June 2022. "He is very, very advanced for his age, both physically and physically, and he also has a very good understanding of the game. We trust him that he will hold his ground in the long term," said sporting director Horst Heldt in justification go the contract extension.

On 5 December 2020, Thielmann scored his first goal as a professional in a 2–2 draw against VfL Wolfsburg. On 20 January 2021, he scored an injury time winner against Schalke 04 in a relegation six-pointer. On 30 April 2021, the club announced that Thielmann's contract had been extended until 2024. In June 2022, he was nominated for the Golden Boy, an award given to the best under-21 player in European football.

Career statistics

References

External links
 
 

2002 births
Living people
People from Trier-Saarburg
German footballers
Germany under-21 international footballers
Germany youth international footballers
1. FC Köln players
1. FC Köln II players
SV Eintracht Trier 05 players
Bundesliga players
Association football wingers
Footballers from Rhineland-Palatinate